Van Hunt (born March 8, 1970) is an American singer, songwriter, multi-instrumentalist and record producer. He released his debut album, Van Hunt, in 2004, and a follow-up, On the Jungle Floor, in 2006, both on Capitol Records. He won the Grammy Award for Best R&B Performance by a Duo or Group with Vocals for appearing on the tribute version of the Sly & the Family Stone song, "Family Affair", in 2007. He transitioned to Blue Note Records where his 2008 album, Popular, was shelved and would not be released until 2017. He self-released the compilation album Use in Case of Emergency in 2009.

Early life
Hunt was born in Dayton, Ohio. His father, Van Hunt Sr., was a friend of Ohio Players drummer Jimmy "Diamond" Williams. Hunt took up the drums at age 7, and saxophone at the age of 8, later adding bass and keyboards. Guitar was the last instrument he learned to play; he played guitar in a rock band called Royalty. Hunt moved to Arlington, Texas for a short time before relocating to Atlanta, Georgia in 1996 to attend Morehouse College, where he studied English, but soon dropped out. In Atlanta, he started producing a few hip-hop demos for Atlanta rappers in order to pay bills. Hunt met up-and-coming record producers and artists like Dallas Austin, Jermaine Dupri and TLC through his work on demos.

Career

Early career
Hunt wrote and co-produced the song "Hopeless" for singer Dionne Farris, formerly of Arrested Development, and joined her band on guitar and keyboards. "Hopeless" appeared on the soundtrack for the film Love Jones (1997). Hunt co-wrote several songs with Rahsaan Patterson on his album Love in Stereo (1999), and co-wrote with Cree Summer, including the song "Mean Sleep", for her album Street Faërie (1999), produced by Lenny Kravitz. He also collaborated with Joi on the single "Missing You" (2002). Through Dionne Farris, Hunt met A&R person Randy Jackson (who later went on to be a judge on Fox's American Idol). Jackson would become Hunt's manager in 2002.

Capitol records
Hunt recorded much of the songs from his debut album in 2000. Producer Dallas Austin took Hunt's recording to Capitol Records, leading him to sign with the label in 2001. Hunt's first album, Van Hunt, was released in February 2004. The album included the singles "Down Here in Hell (With You)", "Dust", and "Seconds of Pleasure", and was nominated for a Grammy Award for Best Urban/Alternative Performance. Hunt's second album, On the Jungle Floor, was released in 2006. The album featured the single, "Character," a revisited "Mean Sleep", as a duet with Nikka Costa, and a cover of "No Sense of Crime" by The Stooges. The album was co-produced by Bill Bottrell. Hunt has toured and appeared with Mary J. Blige, Alicia Keys, Boney James, The Roots, Seal, Angie Stone, Coldplay, The Brand New Heavies, the Dave Matthews Band, and Kanye West.

In 2006, Hunt appeared with Nikka Costa on the Sam Moore album, Overnight Sensational, on the song "If I Had No Loot". Hunt was also featured on "Half the Fun", a track on the Count Bass D album, Act Your Waist Size, released on Fat Beats Records.

In 2007, Hunt won a Grammy Award for Best R&B Performance by a Duo or Group with Vocals, along with John Legend and Joss Stone, for their cover of the Sly & the Family Stone song, "Family Affair", which appeared on the 2006 tribute album  Different Strokes by Different Folks. Hunt described winning the award as "one of the bigger pleasures I've had" to The Athens Blur Magazine in 2009.

Blue Note
Hunt released the 4 track digital EP, The Popular Machine, on August 7, 2007. Hunt announced a full-length album, Popular, to be released on Blue Note Records on January 15, 2008. Hunt moved from Atlanta to Los Angeles in 2007 while the album was nearing completion. Blue Note had taken over Hunt's recording contract after corporate restructuring at Blue Note and Capitol's parent company, EMI. In December 2007, Blue Note announced that they would not be releasing the album, and that Hunt and the label mutually agreed to part ways. Hunt wrote on his MySpace blog in January 2008, that he couldn't promise that Popular would ever be officially released. Blue Note owns the master recordings and opted not to sell it back to him at an affordable price. Hunt commented that he "didn't think that they had enough money" to promote the album properly. LA Weekly called the album an "appealingly trippy fusion of funk grooves, punk guitar and soul vocals", and "a left-field stunner". Hunt told the Atlanta alternative weekly newspaper Creative Loafing that he was "devastated" when the label decided not to release the album. In August 2017, Popular finally saw an official release on all online distributors 10 years after it was shelved.

Independent
As of June 2008, Hunt was recording a fourth album, which he planned to release himself and market using the Internet. Hunt has blogged about his new approach on his MySpace page. Hunt toured the U.S. in July and August 2008. Meanwhile, he released Use in Case of Emergency, a compilation of demos, remixes and B-sides recorded between 1997 and 2005, through his Web site in May 2009. In 2009, Hunt performed on the theme song for the film Hurricane Season, entitled "Be on Our Way." Hunt has also been working on autobiographical book of short stories titled Tales of Friction. In July 2009, Hunt told The Atlanta Journal-Constitution that he plans to release one more album and tour once more, but does not know what his plans are after that. Hunt performed at the National Black Arts Festival's tribute to Curtis Mayfield at Atlanta Symphony Hall on July 16, 2010.

Godless Hotspot and What Were You Hoping For?

On June 14, 2011, Van Hunt took to his Twitter to announce the release of his first song in 3 years. The song "June" was released on June 15 at midnight via Mike Ragogna of The Huffington Post along with the announcement of the title of his forthcoming album (What were you hoping for?) and its release date. A subsequent longer article about the song "June" and the new album and Van's new approach would appear later that same day on the Music remedy website. This article would not only talk about the joint venture-between Hunt's own label Godless-hotspot and Thirty-Tigers. It also goes on to say that "June" is the first of a series of free songs that will be released from various sites up until the release of the new album. The next will be "eyes Like Pearls" the first official single from the album that is set to be released to radio sometime in July

The Fun Rises, the Fun Sets
Van Hunt released updates of work on his upcoming album via PledgeMusic during the course of 2014. In March 2015, he announced the title of his album as The Fun Rises, the Fun Sets, due for release on May 5, 2015. He previewed the release of the new album with the new single "Vega (Stripes On)", which was available for release via iTunes and Amazon and followed this up with another single, "Old Hat". Both tracks had official videos accompany their releases. The album charted at #31 on the US Billboard Top R&B/Hip-Hop Albums.

Influences
 David Bowie
 Serge Gainsbourg
 The Isley Brothers
 Curtis Mayfield
 Thelonious Monk
 The Ohio Players
 Iggy Pop
 Prince
 Richard Pryor
 Sly Stone
 Neil Young

Personal life
He has been in a relationship with actress Halle Berry since April 2020.

Discography

Albums
Van Hunt (2004), Capitol
On the Jungle Floor (2006), Capitol
What Were You Hoping For? (2011) – Godless Hotspot/Thirty Tigers
The Fun Rises, the Fun Sets (2015) – Godless Hotspot/Thirty Tigers
Popular (2017), Blue Note

Compilations
Use in Case of Emergency (2009), self-released – collection of outtakes

EPs
Acoustic E.P. (2004), Capitol – digital EP
Napster Sessions (2004), Capitol – digital EP
Connect Set (2006), Capitol – digital EP
The Popular Machine (2007), Blue Note – digital EP
The Lamplighter Series (2009), Blue Note – digital EP

Singles
"Down Here in Hell (With You)" (2004), Capitol
"Dust" (2004), Capitol
"Seconds of Pleasure" (2004), Capitol
"Character" (2006), Capitol
"Being A Girl" (2006), Capitol
"Eyes Like Pearls" (2011), Godless Hotspot/Thirty Tigers
"Vega (Stripes On)" (2015), Godless Hotspot/Thirty Tigers
"Old Hat" (2015), Godless Hotspot/Thirty Tigers
"Headroom" (2015), Godless Hotspot/Thirty Tigers

Awards and nominations
 2005 Grammy Award nomination for Best Urban/Alternative Performance for "Dust."
 2006 Grammy Award win for Best R&B Performance by a Duo Or Group With Vocals for "Family Affair"

References

External links

Hoard, Christian (May 5, 2004). "Van Hunt Gives Up the Funk" Rolling Stone. Retrieved on April 29, 2007.
"Van Hunt Laid Bare". March 8, 2005. the-raft.com. Retrieved on December 7, 2007.
"Van Hunt – Interview". March 2004. whudat.com. Retrieved on December 8, 2007.

1970 births
20th-century African-American musicians
21st-century African-American musicians
20th-century American musicians
21st-century American musicians
African-American songwriters
American funk musicians
American multi-instrumentalists
American neo soul singers
American soul musicians
Capitol Records artists
Grammy Award winners
Record producers from Georgia (U.S. state)
Record producers from Ohio
Living people
Morehouse College alumni
Musicians from Atlanta
Musicians from Dayton, Ohio